Bagrichthys vaillantii is one of species of bagrid catfish in the genus Bagrichthys. This fish is endemic to Indonesia where it is found in the Mahakam River basin in eastern Borneo.

The fish is named in honor of Léon Vaillant (1834-1914) of the Muséum national d’Histoire naturelle in Paris. He described this species in 1902 but had used a preoccupied name so it had to be renamed.

References 
 

Bagridae
Fish of Asia
Freshwater fish of Indonesia
Fish described in 1906
Taxa named by Canna Maria Louise Popta